Woodrow Stanley Lloyd (July 16, 1913 – April 7, 1972) was a Canadian politician and educator. Born in Saskatchewan in 1913, he became a teacher in the early 1930s. He worked as a teacher and school principal until 1944 and was involved with the Saskatchewan Teachers' Federation, eventually becoming its president.

He was first elected as a Member of the Legislative Assembly  of Saskatchewan in 1944. He served as Education Minister and then Treasurer in Tommy Douglas's Co-operative Commonwealth Federation government between 1944 and 1961.  He succeeded Douglas as Saskatchewan Premier in late 1961. Lloyd is best remembered as the man who piloted Canada's first Medicare program from legislation to implementation in 1962, and overcoming the Saskatchewan doctors' strike that summer strike to enable it to continue.

Lloyd was defeated in the 1964 Saskatchewan general election and served the next six years as the Leader of the Official Opposition. He stepped down as the New Democratic Party's leader in 1970 (the CCF changed its name in 1967), and from the Legislature in 1971. He was appointed to a United Nations post in South Korea, where he died of a heart attack in 1972.

Early life
Lloyd was born in Webb, Saskatchewan on July 16, 1913.  He initially studied engineering, but due to the Great Depression, switched his studies to teaching and graduated with a BA from the University of Saskatchewan in 1936. He started teaching school that year, and eventually became a school principal in the early 1940s at Stewart Valley, Vanguard and Biggar. He was also active in the Saskatchewan Teachers' Federation and held many positions in the organization including the presidency from 1940 to 1944. He also served on the University of Saskatchewan's Senate, and was the president of the Saskatchewan Educational Conference in the early 1940s.

Douglas government
In 1944, Lloyd was elected to the Saskatchewan Legislature as the Co-operative Commonwealth Federation member for the constituency of Biggar, a seat that he held until his retirement in 1971. Lloyd became the youngest cabinet minister in Saskatchewan history, up to that point, when he was appointed to cabinet as Minister of Education by new Premier, Tommy Douglas. Lloyd served as Minister of Education for the next 16 years and oversaw the complete overhaul of the Saskatchewan education system. The most controversial measure he introduced was the amalgamation of over 5000 of Saskatchewan's local school boards (units) into 56 larger school units in 1944–1945. The measure was instituted to create more equitable educational opportunities for students across the province by providing students greater opportunity to receive instruction by specialized teachers and access to increased education resources, including provincial grants.

However, the move was opposed by some in rural Saskatchewan who resented the loss of local control over schools, as the move to large school units resulted in the closure of nearly all rural one-room schools over the next two decades.

After the 1960 election, Douglas appointed Lloyd to be the provincial treasurer. In 1961, Douglas resigned as premier to assume the leadership of the newly-formed federal New Democratic Party (NDP). Lloyd was elected as leader of what was now called the Saskatchewan CCF-NDP, easily defeating Olaf Turnbull.

Premier of Saskatchewan
As Premier, Lloyd was responsible for implementing the universal health care plan that Douglas had introduced. Lloyd's government had to cope with the July 1962 Saskatchewan doctors' strike, when the province's physicians withdrew service in an attempt to defeat the Medicare initiative. Lloyd and his government refused to back down on the concept of a universal public health care system and persuaded the doctors to settle after 23 days.

Medicare was implemented, but the political turmoil did lasting damage to the Lloyd government and contributed to its defeat at the hands of Ross Thatcher's Saskatchewan Liberal Party in the 1964 provincial election. Medicare was later extended to all provinces and territories in Canada as a result of the Saskatchewan experiment.

Lloyd was the first premier of Saskatchewan to have been born in the province after its accession to Confederation in 1905.

Later life
After his government's defeat, Lloyd became Leader of the Opposition, a post he held until 1970 when Allan Blakeney was elected leader of the Saskatchewan NDP. On his retirement, Douglas gave him the ultimate compliment by saying that Lloyd was "the conscience of the government and the conscience of the party." After retirement from the Saskatchewan Legislature in 1971, Lloyd was appointed as representative for the United Nations Development Program in South Korea. However just months after assuming that post, he died suddenly in Seoul, South Korea.

Electoral history

Saskatchewan general elections, 1944 to 1960 

Lloyd led the CCF in two general elections: 1964 and 1967.  The CCF was defeated both times.

1964 General election 

The 1964 election was very close in the popular vote, with a difference of only 660 votes between the Liberals and the CCF.  The distribution of votes in the ridings gave the Liberals a majority, ending the CCF's seventeen year term in office.  Ross Thatcher defeated Lloyd and became Premier.  Lloyd became Leader of the Opposition.

1 Leader of the Opposition before election was called;  Premier after election. 
2 Premier when election was called;  Leader of the Opposition after election.
3 Rounds to zero.

1967 General election 

In the 1967 election, Lloyd again led the CCF, now re-named the NDP, against Ross Thatcher and the Liberals.  The Liberals were returned to office, the last time the Liberals formed the government.  Lloyd resigned as party leader before the next election, being succeeded by Alan Blakeney.

1 Premier before election was called;  Premier after election. 
2 Leader of the Opposition when election was called;  Leader of the Opposition after election.

Saskatchewan constituency elections 

Lloyd stood for election to the Legislative Assembly in seven general elections, all in the constituency of Biggar.  He was elected in all seven elections, from 1944 to 1967.

1944 General election:  Biggar

E Elected.

1948 General election:  Biggar

E Elected.
X Incumbent.

1952 General election:  Biggar

E Elected.
X Incumbent.

1956 General election:  Biggar

1960 General election:  Biggar

E Elected.
X Incumbent.
1 Rounding error.

1964 General election:  Biggar

E Elected.
X Incumbent.

1967 General election:  Biggar

E Elected.
X Incumbent.

Citations

References
 
 
 
 
 
 

Premiers of Saskatchewan
Lloyd, Woodrow S.
Lloyd, Woodrow S.
Leaders of the Saskatchewan CCF/NDP
Saskatchewan Co-operative Commonwealth Federation MLAs
20th-century Canadian politicians
Saskatchewan New Democratic Party MLAs